From 1970, this human rights group was chaired by Israel Shahak. It was briefly a member of the International League for Human Rights, but was suspended in 1973. This was related to the organisation's 1972 AGM, on 16 November, which was broken up by some 200 members of the Young Israeli Labor Party assisted by members of the GSS. Both Uri Davis and Felicia Langer have served as vice-chair.

References

International human rights organizations
Human rights organizations based in Israel